Hospital for Incurables may refer to:
 Ospedale degli Incurabili, the Neapolitan Hospital for Incurables
 Royal Edinburgh Hospital for Incurables
 Royal Hospital, Donnybrook
 Royal Hospital for Incurables
 Royal Hospital for Neuro-disability
 Hospital for Incurables (New York City) on Roosevelt Island